Salat al-Istikhaara, which translates to Prayer of Seeking Counsel, is a prayer recited by Muslims who are in need of guidance from God Almighty (Allah) when facing a decision in their life. The prayer, known as salah in Arabic is performed in two units of prayer or raka'ah followed by the supplication of Salat al-Istikhaara.

Description of the prayer
The description of Salat al-Istikhaara which translates to "Prayer of Seeking Counsel" was narrated by the well known disciple of the Islamic prophet Muhammad, Jabir ibn ‘Abd-Allah al-Salami, who said:

"The Messenger of Allah used to teach his companions to seek counsel from Allah (Istikhaara) in all things, just as he used to teach them chapters from the Qur'an. He said:

'If any one of you is concerned about a decision he has to make or wants to take an action then let him pray two units raka'ah of voluntary salah prayer and say:

"O Allah, I seek Your counsel through Your knowledge and I seek Your assistance through Your might and I ask You from Your immense favour, for verily You alone decree our fate while I do not, and You know while I do not, and You alone possess all knowledge of the Unseen. O Allah, if You know this matter ( mention matter here ) to be good for me in relation to my religion, my life and livelihood and the end of my affairs, my present and future, then decree it for me and facilitate it for me, and then place blessing for me within it, and if You know this affair to be harmful for me concerning my religion, my life and livelihood and the end of my affairs, then remove it from me and remove me from it, and decree for me what is good, wherever it may be, and make me content with it."

Another translation is as follows:
O Allah, I seek Your guidance [in making a choice] by virtue of Your knowledge, and I seek ability by virtue of Your power, and I ask You of Your great bounty. You have power, I have none. And You know, I know not. You are the Knower of hidden things. O Allah, if in Your knowledge, this matter (then it should be mentioned by name) is good for me both in this world and the hereafter, then ordain it for me, make it easy for me, and bless it for me. And if in Your knowledge it is bad for me and for my religion, my livelihood and my affairs (or: for me both in this world and the next), then turn me away from it, [and turn it away from me], and ordain for me the good wherever it may be and make me pleased with it." (Reported by al-Bukhaari, al-Tirmidhi, al-Nisaa'i, Abu Dawood, Ibn Maajah and Ahmad)

Conditions of the prayer

One must wash themselves ahead of the Salat al-Istikharah, in the same manner as one would do when entering into any salah.

Ibn Hajr said, commenting on this hadith:
"Istikharah is a word which means asking Allah to help one make a choice, meaning choosing the best of two things where one needs to choose one of them."

With the salaa completed one should immediately say the supplication of Istikhaara.

Istikhaara is done when a decision is to be made in matters which are neither obligatory nor prohibited. So one does not need to seek counsel from Allah for deciding whether he should go for hajj or not. Because if he is financially and physically able to do it then hajj is obligatory and he does not have a choice.

But seeking counsel from Allah (Istikhaara) can be done in all kind of other permissible matters where a choice needs to be made such as buying something, taking a job or choosing a spouse etc.

It is recorded in hadith that Muhammad used to teach his disciples to seek counsel from Allah (Istikhaara) for every matter just as he used to teach them the Sürah from the Qur'an. In another Hadith the Prophet Muhammad (“May Allah honor him and grant him peace” or “peace and blessings of Allah be upon him”)  said:

"He who seeks counsel from Allah (Istikhaara) will not fail and he who consults and seeks advice from people will not regret".

Language

The original Arabic text is below, followed by transliteration using Latin characters.

It is also essential is that the reader's heart is sincerely rendered humble to God in full reliance and trust:

Allahumma innee astakheeruka bi ilmika wa-astaqdiruka biqudratika wa-as'aluka min fadhlika al-adheem. Fa innaka taqdiru walaa aqdiru. Wa ta'lamu walaa a'lamu wa anta 'alamul ghuyoob. Allahumma in kunta ta'lamu anna haadhal-amra (mention your concern) khayrun liy fiy deeniy wa-ma'aashiy wa-'aaqibati amriy, faqdur hu liy wa-'yassir hu- liy thumma baarik liy feehi. Wa in-kunta ta'lamu anna haadhal amra sharrun liy fiy deeniy wa-ma'aashiy wa-'aaqibati amriy. Fa-srifhu 'annee wa-srifni 'anhu. Wa aqdur lial khayra haythu kaana thumma a-rdhiniy bihee

References

Salah terminology